Isocarpha microcephala is a New World species of plants in the family Asteraceae. It has been found only in Perú and Ecuador.

Isocarpha microcephala is an annual or perennial herb up to 100 cm (40 inches) tall. Leaves are up to 7 cm (2.8 inches) long. One plant produces several flower heads, each head with 80-140 white, pink, or purple disc flowers but no ray flowers.

References

Eupatorieae
Flora of Peru
Flora of Ecuador
Plants described in 1836